Andrew Jackson and Sarah Jane Masters House is single-family residence located in east of Hillsboro, Oregon and west of Aloha, Oregon. It is listed on the National Register of Historic Places in 2015.

History 

The house was commissioned between 1853 and 1854 by Sarah Jane Masters. The house is a classic example of neoclassical architecture. It is one of the two houses owned by the City of Hillsboro. The other one is 1912-built Malcolm McDonald House, also listed with NRHP.

Gallery

References

External links

National Register of Historic Places in Washington County, Oregon
Houses in Washington County, Oregon
Houses on the National Register of Historic Places in Oregon
1854 establishments in Oregon Territory
Houses completed in 1854